Bickleton Elementary and High School is a pre-kindergarten through 12th grade learning establishment in Bickleton, Washington. It is a part of the Bickleton School District. Despite covering such a large number of grades, the enrollment is only 91 students, 58% of which are white, 31% of which are Spanish. The rest are Asian or unknown.

References

External links
Bickleton School District

Public high schools in Washington (state)
High schools in Klickitat County, Washington